Thomas Strudwick (born 17 October 2001) is a British motorcycle road racer from West Sussex.

In 2020, Strudwick raced in the Open600 class of the Campeonato de España de Superbike (ESBK) for the Team Edge RST Racing Team.

He was selected as one of 22 riders chosen to compete in the inaugural 2018 British Talent Cup, a controlled-formula series, and he also rode in the Motostar British Championship for superbike team Moto Rapido Moto3. More recently in 2019, Strudwick competed in the British Supersport Championship in the GP2 class, alongside the Case FTR Moto team.

Previously Strudwick raced in the Moto3 Standard support class to the British Superbike Championship, where he achieved three wins finishing in third-place of the 2017 championship.

Achievements 
On 1 April 2018, Strudwick won the inaugural British Talent Cup race at Donington Park. The championship was conceived during 2017 by the MotoGPTM world championship organisers Dorna to promote young British riders.

In 2015, Strudwick competed in the KTM British Junior Cup for MTS Racing. He became the youngest-ever winner of a British championship motorcycle race at the age of 13 years and 247 days on 21 June 2015, replacing the former accolade-holder Kyle Ryde.

Career statistics

References

External links 

 
British Supersport Championship

2001 births
Living people
English motorcycle racers
Sportspeople from West Sussex